Czerwony Sztandar was a Polish language daily newspaper, published by the Soviet occupation authorities in the city of Lwów (Lviv, Ukraine), between 5 October 1939 and June 1941, and then again between 1944 and 1950. Its circulation was 40,000 copies daily and the publication contained Soviet propaganda against the Second Polish Republic, clergy and the defeated Polish state authorities. The editor of the newspaper was Jan Brzoza.

Among writers who published there were Wanda Wasilewska, Julian Stryjkowski, Lucjan Szenwald, Stanisław Jerzy Lec, Władysław Broniewski, Janina Broniewska, Tadeusz Boy-Żeleński and Leon Chwistek. In November 1939, a declaration of Polish writers was published in support of the incorporation of the Western Ukraine into Soviet Union.

References

See also
 Nowe Widnokręgi

Polish-language newspapers
Newspapers established in 1939
Publications disestablished in 1941
Newspapers published in the Soviet Union
Communist newspapers
Soviet occupation of Eastern Poland 1939–1941
Mass media in Lviv
1939 establishments in Ukraine
1941 disestablishments in Ukraine